The Babylon 5 Collectible Card Game (B5 CCG) is an out-of-print collectible card game set in the Babylon 5 universe.  The game is ideally set for 4-5 players but can be played with a minimum of two players up to as many as 20 if using multiple Non-Aligned Factions and Home Factions.  This CCG is distinct from most others of the genre for being specifically designed to be played by more than two players. The gameplay tends to have strong political elements encouraging significant player interaction aka "table talk" which is appropriate for a game based on a series which featured such a strong element of political intrigue. During its brief six-year existence under the Precedence Entertainment banner it released two core sets, five expansions sets and one revision set.  There were two World Championships during that time.  The game still continues to have a cult following as further expansions were made available online.

History
Initially hoping for a November release, the game hit store shelves on December 11, 1997 in North America with the release of Premiere. Precedence then began hiring more staff to promote the B5 CCG as quickly and completely as possible. A large part of their success came with their promoting of the game. Not only would they give free starter decks at major conventions but they offered solid prize support for local tournaments that were organised through their Ranger program. Precedence was also the first company to begin a successful promo chase card program, where various promo cards were made available through different means of acquiring them, some more difficult than others.  This, as opposed to other companies who offered relatively common cards as promos, gave Precedence an edge in marketing not seen before. They followed up their debut with the Shadows expansion and within the same year released the Deluxe edition, a reprint of the Premier Edition (minus the starter decks) and the Great War expansion.  By the beginning of 1999, they found themselves near the top of the CCG market at that time.

"1998 was a year of triple digit growth for Precedence, much of it spurred on by the broad based international success of our Babylon 5 Collectible Card Game," reports Precedence Entertainment CEO Paul W. Brown III

"For some months now, Babylon 5 has been one of the best selling and most played hobby card games in every country where the game is sold; particularly in North America, the UK and as far abroad as Australia.  The enthusiasm and support of the fans has been overwhelming," stated Brown. "We're most proud of the game's reputation for being true to the show. When your die- hard players even include people who have written for the actual series, like Babylon 5's original executive story editor Larry Ditillio, you know you're doing something right."

In 1999, Precedence and Warner Brothers came to an agreement to renew the licensing to continue use of the Babylon 5 franchise until June 2001.

After their breakout year they released Psi Corps, an expansion dedicated to the world of telepaths. To promote this release, Precedence ran a contest where booster pack purchasers could collect 5 randomly inserted psi corps identicards (chase cards) to redeem them for a chance to have dinner with Walter Koenig, the actor who portrayed Alfred Bester on the show. This was followed by Severed Dreams the same year and in 2000, Wheel of Fire and Crusade.

In June 2001 Warner Brothers chose not to renew Precedence's license which brought publication/distribution of the game to an abrupt halt. This caused the cancellation of the Collector's set which was already at the printers, and the well into development Anla'shok expansion. The company closed its doors in 2002 although this was not as a direct result of the ending of the Babylon 5 licensing agreement with WB.

Product history
The Babylon 5 CCG was released as a base set (Premier) in 1997. It consisted of between 300-400 cards sold in starter packs of 60 cards and booster packs of 8 cards.

It was followed by seven expansion sets:
 The Shadows (1998)
 Deluxe (basically a reprint of Premier including the "fixed" cards from the starter decks but no starter decks themselves) (1998)
 Great War (December 1998)
 Psi Corps (1999)
 Severed Dreams (1999)
 Wheel of Fire (2000)
 Crusade (2000)

The Collectors Set was at the printers at the time that the games production was stopped.

A number of fan sets have been created and there is an active Facebook group led by Bruce Mason, one of the senior Rangers, that is re-imagining the game under the name the B5 Virtual Card Game (B5VCG)

World Championships

During the course of the B5 CCG lifespan, Precedence Entertainment held two World Championships.  Each featured a large proportion of players from around the world and fierce competition:

First World Championship
The first B5 CCG World Championship was held at Vorcon 1 in Pomona, California, October 16–18, 1998. Held at the Sheraton Fairplex Hotel & Conference Center, the eventual winner was Canadian champion, Serge Lavergne of Ottawa, Ontario, Canada.  He had used a Narn / Vorlon military hybrid speed deck with the “Order Above All” winning agenda.

Opposition came from Australians Steve Green and Les Allen, Marcel Kopper of Germany, UK Champion Mike Pemberthy, Pan-European Champion Hayden Gittings, as well as Americans John 
Paiva, Pete Simpson, Kyle Bennick, Mike Jasperson, Anthony Oshmago, David Sisson, Paul Beaman, Kyle Sykora and John and Johnna Golden.

Second World Championship
The second B5 CCG World Championship was in Aachen, Germany, October 8–10, 1999. The champion there was Martin Franz who used a Human deck with the agenda “A Rising Power”.  The Final table comprised Marco Schütz (Narn), Michael Brand (Minbari), Peter Ender (Centauri) and Paul Sheward (Non-Aligned).

The second World Championship again featured national qualifiers, but there was also a pre-qualifying tournament run the day before. This allowed a number of locally based players to qualify for the World Championship itself and led to the makeup of the "top table" i.e. 4 out of the 5 players were "local" Germans. It was commented upon that this turned the World Final into a team event with the German players ensuring that one of them won the tournament.

Zeta Squadron
Zeta Squadron was the official member club of B5 CCG players registered with Precedence publishing.  They received newsletters which informed them of upcoming events and expansions. They also received promo cards such as the Na'Toth (variant).

An equivalent newsletter "Black Omega" was published in the United Kingdom supporting the European player base.

The Rangers
The Rangers were tournament organizers from around the world who conducted sanctioned tournaments, game demonstrations and arranged playtesting on behalf of Precedence.

Tournament Formats
There are several variant tournament formats that can be used when playing the B5 CCG.  Below is a listed of most commonly used formats.

Game Cards, Mechanics and Rules
Comprehensive lists of all published B5 CCG cards can be found on the Vorlon Space website together with the game rules and addendum

A distilled version of the material published on Vorlon Space can be found here

Signed/Embossed Cards
Precedence randomly included cards autographed by actors from the show in booster packs in every set/expansion that was produced. With the exception of the Premier edition, these cards were also embossed with Precedence's logo to confirm authenticity.[7]

In most cases these boosters were also "God packs" i.e. where every card in the booster was of rare rarity replacing the normal distribution of common and uncommon cards.

Promo Cards
Precedence also produced promotional cards for each of the sets/expansions. The cards were distributed as tournament prizes, box toppers, with hobby magazines such as Scrye and also by mail-in offers.

"Surprise"
The card "Surprise" was produced and printed as a test of the print process and of the card design and layout e.g. the placement of "marks".[8] It is the only card that was declared illegal to play in a tournament environment due, in the most part, to the illegal placement of the Shadow Mark on the card. In the history of the game, only one player outside the Precedence development team was ever authorized to be able to legally play Surprise. That player is Hayden Gittens who won that privilege when he was the victor in a "beat the designers" game held at the 1st World Championships.

Typically Surprise was awarded to the winners of major tournaments and the World Championships

"The Rarest of the Rare"
Many players believe that Surprise is the rarest and hardest to obtain card in the game due to its origins as a test card, that it was never included in any starter or booster distribution and because it was typically only given to the winners of major tournaments such as regionals or the World Championships. Actually this is not the case. A very small number of embossed Defector Revealed cards signed by Claudia Christian were distributed as part of a charity auction and some may have found their way into booster packs, although this is unconfirmed. There are believed to be less than 20 of these cards in circulation and this number maybe as low as 12.[9]

When the Premier Edition was reprinted, as the Deluxe Edition, the card "As It Was Meant to Be" incurred a misprint. Intended to be a Major Agenda, one of the two cards on the master sheet was incorrectly labelled as just "Agenda".[10] Most of these misprints were pulled prior to distribution in boosters but an unknown number did make it into circulation. Rumour has it that Kevin Tewart, the competitive play coordinator of the Babylon 5 CCG, had a large box of these cards under his desk at the Precedence offices.

But even those are not the rarest cards in circulation...

The rarest card in circulation is a signed and embossed Doctor Franklin signed by the late Richard Biggs. At the time of writing there are only 2 of these cards known to exist.

Online Play
Programs such as LackeyCCG and Vassal allow players to meet and play online.

References

External links
 Vassal - Online game play
 LackeyCCG - Online game play
 Vorlon Space - Fan site, card database, trading zone.
 Precedence's discontinuation statement - Statement on the old Precedence site about the discontinuation of Babylon 5 CCG
Review in French magazine Backstab

Card games introduced in 1997
Collectible card games
Babylon 5